Lewkowicz is a surname and can refer to the following persons:

Sampson Lewkowicz (born 1951), an Uruguayan-American boxing promoter and manager
Sara Naomi Lewkowicz, an American photographer
Sev Lewkowicz (born 1951), an English musical composer, producer, arranger and keyboard player
K. S. Lewkowicz, an English composer and musical writer

Surnames
Polish-language surnames
Jewish surnames